In 1803 the Pettah of Ahmednagar, had forty bastions, or round towers: eight of them were large, with two guns in each; the remainder had only loopholes. There were twelve gates, without any detached works for defence.

A gunshot to the east of the pettah was the Fort of Ahmednagar. A small river came from the northward, round the west side of the pettah, and passed to the southward of the fort. A nullah also passed from the northward, between the fort and a town called Bhingar, about a gunshot to the eastward, and joined the river.

Two nills or covered aqueducts came from the hills, a mile or more to the north, passed through and supplied the pettah and the town, and then went into the fort, either under or through the ditch, into which the waste water fell.

Capture during Second Anglo-Maratha War
On 8 August 1803 during the Second Anglo-Maratha War, forces under the command of Sir Arthur Wellesley (later the Duke of Wellington) stormed and captured the town.

Wellesley sent forward his stormers against the pettah, having first pointed out to the leaders where they were to fix their ladders. The assault was gallantly led; but within ten minutes five of the officers leading the first attacking party were killed or wounded, the ladders were thrown down and broken; the attack had failed.

Another attacking party had only two ladders; the rush of the stormers broke down one; but, on the other, the stormers, commanded by Captain Vesey and headed by Lieutenant Colin Campbell, forced their way up. About 150 men had gained the rampart when a cannon-shot smashed the ladder. The fate of the stormers, thus cut off, might have seemed hopeless; but they leaped down the inner side of the wall, forced their way through the streets to the central gate, against which another party of stormers was battering on the outside, opened it, let in their comrades, and the town was won. Wellesley then turned his attention to the nearby fort, which after a cannonade surrendered on terms and the garrison marched out with full military honours.
The successful assault carried out with such apparent ease made a strong impression on the Indians. Golka, a Mahratta chief, wrote to a friend shortly after the incident:

Notes

References
 
 
 

Attribution

Further reading
 

Forts in Maharashtra
Ahmednagar